General Sir Archibald Hunter,  (6 September 1856 – 28 June 1936) was a senior officer in the British Army who distinguished himself during the Boer War. He was Governor of Omdurman, in Sudan, and later of Gibraltar.

Early life
Archibald Hunter, born a twin, was the son of an Archibald Hunter (1805–1868), a London businessman and Mary Jane Graham (1833–1905). Having chosen not to follow his father's business routes, Hunter began military education in Glasgow, and then at the Royal Military College Sandhurst. In 1875, the nineteen-year-old sub lieutenant joined the 4th (King's Own Royal) Regiment.

Mahdi Uprising
Between 1884 and 1885, Hunter joined the Gordon Relief Expedition, which sought to rescue Major General Charles George Gordon from his Mahdi captives. The expedition was, however, too late; Gordon had been killed two days before their arrival.

During the time in which the Mahdi's were being suppressed, Hunter saw much front line action. He led a brigade under the command of Major General Grenfell in Suakin. He was wounded on this mission.

He was appointed Governor of Dongola Province in the Sudan and Commandant of the Frontier Field Force in 1895. In 1896, he joined the Anglo-Egyptian Nile Expeditionary Force under Lord Kitchener, the Sirdar (commander of the Egyptian Army), Hunter commanding the Egyptian Army Division during the reconquest of the Sudan, which culminated in the Battle of Omdurman in September 1898. He was made Governor of Omdurman in Sudan in 1899, and was appointed in command of the Quetta district in India later the same year.

Second Boer War

At the outbreak of the Second Boer War in October 1899, Major General Hunter (although actually Chief of Staff to General Sir Redvers Buller's 1st Army Corps) was on the staff of Sir George White's Natal Field Force during the Battle of Ladysmith in Natal and the subsequent 118-day siege. On 8 December he successfully led a small raid against one of the Boers' Creusot "Long Tom" guns and a howitzer which they disabled with cotton charges.

The town was relieved on 1 March 1900 and Hunter was promoted to lieutenant general on 6 March and posted as General Officer Commanding 10th Division.

The 10th Division were sent to join Lord Roberts' army on the western front of South Africa which was now camped at the captured Orange Free State capital Bloemfontein.  Hunter led them in the march on Pretoria, crossing into the Transvaal Republic on 3 May. Once Pretoria was captured though Robert's army had to deal with Guerrilla warfare and General Hunter was sent south again as overall commander of five columns that converged on the Free State army camped at Brandwater Basin, forcing the surrender of 4,314 Boers led by Marthinus Prinsloo.  It was the largest number of Boers captured in the war so far and cost very little in British casualties; only 33 dead and 242 wounded.

Later life
In early 1901 he was asked by King Edward VII to take part in a special diplomatic mission to announce the King's accession to the governments of Denmark, Sweden and Norway, Russia, Germany, and Saxony.

Hunter became General Officer Commanding Scottish District in May 1901, Commander-in-Chief Bombay Command in 1903 (renamed Western Army Corps in 1905) and General Officer Commanding Southern Army in India from 1907.

From 1910 until 1913 he was Governor of Gibraltar, after which he was appointed colonel of the King's Own (Royal Lancaster Regiment), a position he held until 1926.

In August 1914 Hunter was living in Scotland as a half-pay officer. Writing to his former commander Lord Horatio Kitchener he stated "I live in hopes of your giving me a command". Too old for a field command in the First World War, he was posted to Aldershot, first in the key role of GOC Aldershot Training Centre and then as GOC Aldershot Command. He retired in 1918.

Hunter was elected at the 1918 general election as a Coalition Conservative Member of Parliament (MP) for Lancaster, but stood down at the 1922 general election.

Honours and awards
Hunter was an honorary freeman of the borough of Lancaster.

Hunter received the honorary Doctor of Laws (LL.D) from the University of Glasgow in June 1901.

He received the following decorations:
GCB  : Knight Grand Cross of the Order of the Bath
GCVO: Knight Grand Cross of the Royal Victorian Order
DSO  : Distinguished Service Order

Family

Archibald Hunter married, in 1910, Mary, Dowager Baroness Inverclyde (1866–1924), widow of George Burns, 2nd Baron Inverclyde (1861–1905) and daughter of Hickson Fergusson. There was no issue of the marriage.

Legacy
His archive of over one hundred letters and documents was recently sold. A highlight of the £15,000 collection included twenty six autographed letters from Kitchener.

References

Further reading 
 Kitchener's Sword-Arm: the Life and Campaigns of General Sir Archibald Hunter, Archie Hunter.
 C. Grocott, 'A Good Soldier, But a Maligned Governor: General Sir Archibald Hunter, Governor of Gibraltar 1910–1913', Journal of Imperial and Commonwealth History, September 2009
 Duncan H. Doolittle, "A Soldier's Hero: The Life of General Sir Archibald Hunter," Narragansett, Rhode Island 1991

External links

 

|-
 

|-
 

|-

 

|-

1856 births
1936 deaths
British Army generals
British Army personnel of the Mahdist War
British Army personnel of the Second Boer War
Governors of Gibraltar
Graduates of the Royal Military College, Sandhurst
King's Own Royal Regiment officers
Conservative Party (UK) MPs for English constituencies
UK MPs 1918–1922
Knights Grand Cross of the Order of the Bath
Knights Grand Cross of the Royal Victorian Order
Companions of the Distinguished Service Order
British Army generals of World War I